Gustave Serrurier-Bovy (1858–1910) was a Belgian architect and furniture designer. He is credited (along with Paul Hankar, Victor Horta and Henry van de Velde) with creating the Art Nouveau style, coined as a style in Paris by art dealer Siegfried Bing.

Artistic career
Serrurier-Bovy was born in Liège.  In 1884 he visited London, where he became interested in the Arts and Crafts movement. He returned to Belgium and put several of the new movement's concepts into practice into his creations, which he sold at his store in Liège.

He also designed his own villa, "L'Aube," situated in the Parc de Cointe, in Liège, and produced work for the Brussels International (1897).  He died in Liège.

Serrurier-Bovy became known for his line of simple, refined furniture.

Several pieces of his furniture are on display in the Art Nouveau section at the Musée d'Orsay in Paris, along with those of his fellow Belgian Art Nouveau architects.

Analysis of his work
The work of Gustave Serrurier-Bovy exhibits strong influence of the English Arts and Crafts style, especially the rustic nature of that style. During his stay in England, Serrurier-Bovy became fascinated with the work of William Morris.

The resulting designs followed the English model, but differed in its more extensive use of asymmetry, which had been a growing aspect of English furniture since the work of Edward William Godwin had become popular. He often used asymmetry to advantage, for example combining several pieces of furniture into one unit, such as an open bookcase over a slant-front desk mounted on a chest of drawers flanked on one side by a low cupboard.

Serrurier-Bovy also employed slightly arched trusses in his architectural designs.

References

Belgian architects
Art Nouveau architects
Art Nouveau designers
1858 births
1910 deaths
Walloon people
People from Liège
Belgian furniture designers